In mathematics, the Airy zeta function, studied by , is a function analogous to the Riemann zeta function and related to the zeros of the Airy function.

Definition

The Airy function

is positive for positive x, but oscillates for negative values of x.

The Airy zeta function is the function defined from this sequence of zeros by the series

This series converges when the real part of s is greater than 3/2, and may be extended by analytic continuation to other values of s.

Evaluation at integers
Like the Riemann zeta function, whose value  is the solution to the Basel problem,
the Airy zeta function may be exactly evaluated at s = 2:

where  is the gamma function, a continuous variant of the factorial.
Similar evaluations are also possible for larger integer values of s.

It is conjectured that the analytic continuation of the Airy zeta function evaluates at 1 to

References

External links

Zeta and L-functions